UFC Fight Night: Cowboy vs. Medeiros (also known as UFC Fight Night 126) was a mixed martial arts event produced by the Ultimate Fighting Championship that was held on February 18, 2018, at Frank Erwin Center in Austin, Texas, United States.

Background
The event marked the promotion's third visit to Austin, and first since UFC Fight Night: Edgar vs. Swanson in November 2014.

A welterweight bout between former UFC Lightweight Championship challenger Donald Cerrone and Yancy Medeiros served as the event headliner.

Former Invicta FC Bantamweight Champion and UFC Women's Featherweight Championship challenger Tonya Evinger was expected to face Marion Reneau at the event. However, on January 9, it was announced that Evinger was injured and had to pull out of the bout. In turn, Reneau was pulled from the event and rescheduled to face 2004 Olympic silver medalist in wrestling and former UFC Women's Bantamweight Championship challenger Sara McMann a week later at UFC on Fox: Emmett vs. Stephens.

A flyweight bout between former UFC Flyweight Championship challenger Ray Borg and Brandon Moreno was expected to take place at this event. However, due to an injury sustained by Moreno, the pairing was delayed and rescheduled to take place at UFC 223.

Humberto Bandenay was scheduled to face promotional newcomer Steven Peterson at the event. However, Bandenay was removed from the event in early February due to an alleged visa issue and was replaced by Brandon Davis.

Former Invicta FC Strawweight Champion Lívia Renata Souza was expected to make her debut against former WSOF Women's Strawweight Champion Jessica Aguilar at the event. However, Souza pulled out on February 10 due to a hand injury and the bout was scrapped.

Results

Bonus awards
The following fighters were awarded $50,000 bonuses:
Fight of the Night: Brandon Davis vs. Steven Peterson
Performance of the Night: Derrick Lewis and Curtis Millender

See also
List of UFC events
List of current UFC fighters
2018 in UFC

References

UFC Fight Night
2018 in mixed martial arts
February 2018 sports events in the United States
Sports in Austin, Texas
2018 in sports in Texas